Tingena chrysogramma is a species of moth in the family Oecophoridae. It is endemic to New Zealand and is found in the North and South Islands. The adults of this species inhabits open scrubland and are on the wing in January and February. It has been collected via light traps and beating shrubs. During sunny days this species has been observed resting on leaves and rarely flies. It is regarded as a rare species and has a possible association with Prumnopitys ferruginea.

Taxonomy 
This species was first described by Edward Meyrick in 1883 using a female specimen he collected in Wellington in December at rest on a fence post. He originally named the species Oecophora chrysogramma. Meyrick gave a more detailed description under this name in 1884. In 1915 Meyrick placed this species within the Borkhausenia genus. In 1926 Alfred Philpott studied the genitalia of the male of this species. George Hudson discussed this species under the name B. chrysogramma in his 1928 publication The butterflies and moths of New Zealand. In 1988 J. S. Dugdale placed this species in the genus Tingena. The female holotype is held at the Natural History Museum, London.

Description 

Meyrick first described this species as follows:

Meyrick then went on to give a more detailed description as follows:

Distribution
This species is endemic to New Zealand. Other than its type locality of Wellington, this species has also been observed at Waimarino and at Ohakune. Hudson states that a duller form of this species can be found in the South Island.

Behaviour

This species is on the wing in January and February and is attracted to light. Hudson also collected this species by beating shrubs. During sunny days this species rests on leaves and is rarely observed flying. It is regarded as a rare species and has a possible association with Prumnopitys ferruginea.

Habitat
This species inhabits open scrubland.

References

Oecophoridae
Moths of New Zealand
Moths described in 1883
Endemic fauna of New Zealand
Taxa named by Edward Meyrick
Endemic moths of New Zealand